Mach 2 or variation, may refer to:

 Mach number for twice the speed of sound
 Supersonic speed of 2 times the speed of sound

Automotive
 Ford Mach 2, a 1967 car; see List of Ford vehicles
 Ford Mustang Mach II, a 1970 car; see List of Ford vehicles
 Kawasaki S2 Mach II, the "Mach II" motorcycle

Entertainment
 Mach-2 (Marvel Comics), comic book superhero alter-ego of Marvel Comics character Abner Jenkins
 M.A.C.H. 2 (IPC Media), comic book character from the comic 2000 AD, see M.A.C.H. 1
 Mach 2 (film), a 2001 U.S. skyjacking disaster film

Other uses
 .17 HM2, the .17-calibre Hornady Mach 2 rimfire bullet
 Mach II, a space cadet program at the youth camp Aviation Challenge
 Fly Castelluccio Mach 2, a paramotor aircraft

See also

Mach (disambiguation)
Machii (surname)